At the 1988 Winter Olympics, thirteen Nordic skiing events were contested – eight cross-country skiing events, three ski jumping events, and two Nordic combined events. The team competitions in ski jumping and Nordic combined were new events for these Games.

1988 Winter Olympics events
1988